Waheed Alam Khan (born 1 April 1949) is a Pakistani politician who has been a member of the National Assembly of Pakistan, since August 2018. Previously he was a member of the National Assembly from June 2013 to May 2018.

Early life
He was born on 1 April 1949.

Political career 

Khan served as the Nazim of UC-72 (Anarkali) before getting elected to the National Assembly of Pakistan as a candidate of Pakistan Muslim League (N) (PML-N) from Constituency NA-127 (Lahore-X) in 2013 Pakistani general election.

He was re-elected to the National Assembly as a candidate of PML-N from Constituency NA-125 (Lahore-III) in 2018 Pakistani general election.

References 

Living people
Pakistan Muslim League (N) MNAs
Pakistani MNAs 2013–2018
Politicians from Lahore
1949 births
Pakistani MNAs 2018–2023